The Melbourne United Football Club was an Anglo-Celtic backed association football (soccer) club from Melbourne, Australia. Founded no later than early 1909 and presumably dissolved at the conclusion of the 1910 football season, the short lived club is known for being one of the six clubs to compete in the inaugural Victorian state tier one football league season of 1909, then known as the 'Amateur League'. Except for Williamstown, the five other clubs including United all used Middle Park stadium in Albert Park as a home venue for the regular season and Dockerty Cup matches. The club's colours were dark blue and dark yellow for the 1909 season, and did not achieve any accolades throughout its existence.

References

Soccer clubs in Melbourne
Association football clubs established in 1909
1909 establishments in Australia
Victorian Premier League teams
1910 disestablishments in Australia
Association football clubs disestablished in 1910
Defunct soccer clubs in Australia